Bob Higgins may refer to:
Bob Higgins (American football) (1894–1969), American football player and coach
Bob Higgins (baseball) (1886–1941), professional baseball player
Bob Higgins (footballer) (born 1958), retired English footballer
Bob Higgins (trumpeter) (born 1925)
Bob Higgins, former football coach with Southampton F.C., implicated in the 2016 United Kingdom football sexual abuse scandal

See also
Robert Higgins (disambiguation)